Anwalt Abel (German: Attorney Abel) is a German television film series, broadcast on ZDF between 1988 and 2002. 20 television films were produced, based on the detective novels of Fred Breinersdorfer.

See also
List of German television series

External links
 

1990s German television series
1988 German television series debuts
2002 German television series endings
ZDF original programming
German-language television shows
German legal television series